Fragile site, aphidicolin type, common, fra(3)(p24.2) is a protein that in humans is encoded by the FRA3A gene.

References 

Genes
Human proteins